Kodiak Kowboy (foaled April 16, 2005 in Kentucky) is a retired American Thoroughbred racehorse owned by Vinery Stables and Fox Hill Farms and trained by Steve Asmussen. He was also trained by Larry Jones for part of his career. In 2007 he won a Sovereign Award as Canadian Champion 2-Year-Old Colt.
 
Kodiak Kowboy is a multiple grade one winning horse and top class sprinter. In 2009, he was voted the Eclipse Award as the American Champion Sprint Horse (2009) for his victories in the Carter Handicap, Vosburgh Stakes and Cigar Mile Handicap.

He was retired to stud duty on November 28, 2009 and stood at the Vinery in 2010 as the property of a syndicate for a fee of $15,000.
He shuttled to Brazil in 2014 and then was transferred to Brazil in 2015, and after that, relocated to Uruguay in 2017. 

March 6 Kodiak Kowboy had his first mare checked in foal, Frank Mancini’s Biogio’s Beauty, a multiple stakes-placed winner by top sire Distorted Humor.

He is the sire of Santa Anita Handicap winner MELATONIN, G3SW-US Rated R Superstar, G3SW-UAE Cool Cowboy (now at stud in Russia), G1SW-Brazil Jackson Pollock,
G3SW-Brz Gogo Boy, as well as Brazilian SWs Wil Myers, Eron do Jaguarete and several additional US SWs.

Races (WIP)

References
 Kodiak Kowboy's pedigree and partial racing stats
 

2005 racehorse births
Racehorses bred in Kentucky
Racehorses trained in the United States
Eclipse Award winners
Sovereign Award winners
Thoroughbred family 14-f